Tidö Castle is a castle located 17 km (11 mi) south of Västerås in Västmanland, Sweden.

History

The former castle 
The first building on the site was a medieval house built by the Gren family in the fifteenth century. In 1537, the Gren family sold the castle to the Queen Consort, Margaret Leijonhufvud (1516–1551). In 1540, her husband, King Gustav Vasa, traded the castle to Ekolsund Castle and Tidö came to the Tott family. Today, minor ruins of the former house can be found next to the present building.

The present castle 
The present castle at Tidö was built by the influential statesman and Lord High Chancellor Axel Oxenstierna in 1625–1645. The castle was built around a rectangular courtyard with the main building to the north and the three linked wings to the east, west and south. The main entrance is through a vault in the south wing.

In 1889, the von Schinkel family bought Tidö and they still own it today.  Tidö is one of Sweden's best preserved Baroque palaces, in the Dutch Renaissance style. In 1974, the toy collector Carl-David von Schinkel opened a toy museum at Tidö, with a large collection of historical toys, including toys formerly owned by the royal family. After a merger with the Seriemuseet collection in 2010, when the museum was moved out of the castle to the adjacent stables, the museum operated as Tidö leksaks- och seriemuseum. The entire collection moved to Stockholm in 2017 and today forms the core of the museum Bergrummet – Tidö collection of toys and comics on Skeppsholmen in Stockholm.

See also
 List of castles and palaces in Sweden
 Tidö Agreement

References

External links 
Tidö  Official website

Houses completed in 1645
Castles in Västmanland County
Västmanland
Museums in Västmanland County
Toy museums
Historic house museums in Sweden
1645 establishments in Sweden